Tõnu is an Estonian masculine given name, a version of Anthony.

People named Tõnu include:
Tõnu Aare (born 1953), musician
Tõnu Aav (1939–2019), actor
Tõnu Anton (born 1953), politician and judge
 (born 1935), film director
Tõnu Endrekson (born 1979), rower
Tõnu Haljand (1945–1997), skier
 (born 1966), playwright, designer and critic
Tõnu Kalam, Estonian-American orchestral pianist and conductor
Tõnu Kaljuste (born 1953), conductor
Tõnu Kalvet (born 1970), journalist and politician (:et)
Tõnu Kark (born 1947), actor
Tõnu Kauba (born 1952), physician and politician
Tõnu Kaukis (born 1956), track and field athlete and coach
Tõnu Kilgas (1954–2021), actor and singer
Tõnu Kõiv (born 1968), politician
Tõnu Kõrvits (born 1969), composer
Tõnu-Reid Kukk (1939–2011), politician
Tõnu Laanemäe (born 1977), architect (:et)
Tõnu Laigu (born 1956), architect
Tõnu Lehtsaar (born 1960), psychologist and professor
Tõnu Lepik (born 1946), long jumper
 (born 1941), philosopher
 (born 1940), sculptor
Tõnu Mellik (1934–1993), architect 
Tõnu Mikiver (1943–2017), actor
Tõnu Möls (born 1939), mathematician and biologist
Tõnu Naissoo (born 1951), composer and pianist
Tõnu Õim (born 1941), correspondence chess grandmaster
 (born 1955), ecologist
Tõnu Oja (born 1958), actor
Tõnu Õnnepalu (born 1962), poet and author
Tõnu Ots (born 1941), psychologist (:et)
Tõnu Pedaru (born 1962), journalist and singer (:et)
Tõnu Prima (1902–1992), clergyman (:et)
Tõnu Puu (born 1936), economist 
Tõnu Raadik (born 1957), actor and composer
Tõnu Reim (1853–1938), horticulturist (:et)
Tõnu Saar (born 1944), actor
Tõnu Samuel (born 1972), white hat hacker
Tõnu Sepp (born 1946), musician, teacher, instrument maker 
 (1957–1998), writer and journalist
Tõnu Tepandi (born 1948), actor and singer
Tõnu Tõniste (born 1967), sailor
Tõnu Trubetsky (born 1963), punk musician, writer and anarchist
 (1952–2010), astrophysicist and mathematician
Tõnu Viik (astronomer) (born 1939), astronomer
Tõnu Viik (philosopher) (born 1968), philosopher
Tõnu Virve (1946–2019), theatre and film designer and artist, producer and director
 (?–1898), first Estonian manor owner

See also

Ton (given name)
Tona (name)
Tonu (disambiguation)

Estonian masculine given names